Norton J. Field (September 26, 1839 – after 1881) was a member of the Wisconsin State Assembly.

Biography
Field was born on September 26, 1839 in Elba, New York. In 1857, he graduated from Racine College. During the American Civil War, Field served with the 2nd Wisconsin Volunteer Infantry Regiment of the Union Army. He achieved the rank of first sergeant.

Political career
Field was a member of the Assembly during the 1876, 1877, 1879 and 1881 sessions. He was a Republican.

References

People from Genesee County, New York
Politicians from Racine, Wisconsin
Republican Party members of the Wisconsin State Assembly
Racine College alumni
People of Wisconsin in the American Civil War
Union Army soldiers
1839 births
Year of death missing